Jean Bain is a retired Australian women's basketball player.

Bain played for the Australia women's national basketball team during the late 1960s and early 1970s and competed for Australia at the 1967 World Championship held in South Korea and the 1971 World Championship held in Brazil.

Following her retirement, Bain went on to become a successful junior basketball coach in South Australia.

References

Living people
Australian women's basketball players
Year of birth missing (living people)

Jean Bain née Marshall also played lacrosse for South Australia & Australia. As a teacher at Seacombe High School she recruited for and coached many players for the very successful Seacombe Lacrosse Club 1963 - 1992